Slow Motion (Usporeno kretanje) is a Croatian film directed by Vanča Kljaković. It was released in 1979.

External links
 

1979 films
1970s Croatian-language films
Croatian drama films
1979 drama films
Yugoslav drama films